This article documents the 2007–08 season of Derbyshire football club Chesterfield F.C.

League table

Results

League Two

FA Cup

League Cup

Football League Trophy

Players

First-team squad
Includes all players who were awarded squad numbers during the season.

Left club during season

References 

Chesterfield F.C. seasons
Chesterfield F.C.